This is a list of Brazilian television related events from 1979.

Events

Debuts

Television shows

1970s
Turma da Mônica (1976–present)
Sítio do Picapau Amarelo (1977–1986)

Births
5 March - Érico Brás, actor, singer & comedian
20 June - Marcos Mion, TV host, actor & entrepreneur
19 July - Ellen Rocche, actress & model
28 August - Guilherme Winter, actor
14 September - Ricardo Pereira, actor, model & TV host
22 October - Júlio Rocha, actor

Deaths

See also
1979 in Brazil